Stangeia is a genus of moths in the family Pterophoridae.

Species
Stangeia distantia Clarke, 1986
Stangeia rapae Clarke, 1971
Stangeia siceliota (Zeller, 1847)
Stangeia xerodes (Meyrick, 1886)

Oxyptilini
Moth genera